Julia Anne Lee-Thorp,  (born 20 April 1951) is a South African archaeologist and academic. She is Head of the Stable Light Isotope Laboratory and Professor of Archaeological Science and Bioarchaeology at the University of Oxford. Lee-Thorp is most well known for her work on dietary ecology and human origins, using stable isotope chemistry to study fossil bones and teeth.

Early life and education
Lee-Thorp was born on 20 April 1951 in Cape Town, South Africa. Studying at the University of Cape Town, she graduated with Bachelor of Arts (BA), Bachelor of Science (BSc) with a major in chemistry, and Doctor of Philosophy (PhD) degrees. Her doctoral thesis, titled "Stable carbon isotopes in deep time: the diets of fossil fauna and hominids," was completed in 1989 and demonstrated a method by which to significantly increase the applicable time-span of carbon isotopic analysis by using the mineral form of calcified animal tissue (apatite) as the sample material instead of traditionally used collagen.

Academic career
Lee-Thorp remained at her alma mater, working as a senior research officer at the University of Cape Town's Archaeometry Research Unit (1991 to 1997). She was a senior lecturer in its Faculty of Science from 1998 to 2000 and an associate professor from 2001 to 2004. She was appointed Professor of Archaeology in 2005.

In 2005, she moved to the United Kingdom to take up the post of research director of Archaeological, Geographical and Environmental Sciences at the University of Bradford. She joined the University of Oxford in 2010 as Professor of Archaeological Science and a Fellow of St Cross College, Oxford. She has served as Vice-Head of the School of Archaeology from 2014 to 2016, and has been its Head since 2016.

Research 
Lee-Thorp has been involved in a number of projects in Africa, South America, and Europe. In addition to diet, her more recent research has focused on the role of changing environment, climate, and farming techniques on ancient human societies. Currently, she is involved in the Paleodeserts Project, The Agricultural Origins of Urban Civilization (AGRICURB), and Building a Better Eggtimer.

Honours
In 2013, Lee-Thorp was elected a Fellow of the British Academy (FBA), the United Kingdom's national academy for the humanities and social sciences.

She is also a Fellow of the Royal Society of South Africa.

Selected works

 
 
 
 
 
Lee-Thorp J.A., N.J. van der Merwe 1987.  Carbon isotope analysis of fossil bone apatite. S. Afr. J. Sci. 83: 712-713
Lee-Thorp J.A., N.J. van der Merwe 1991. Aspects of the chemistry of modern and fossil biological apatites. J. Archaeol. Sci. 18: 343-354.
Lee-Thorp J.A., N.J. van der Merwe, C.K. Brain 1994. Diet of Australopithecus robustus at Swartkrans deduced from stable carbon isotope ratios. J. Hum. Evol. 27: 361-372.
Sponheimer M. J.A. Lee-Thorp 1999. Reconstructing the diet of the early hominid Australopithecus africanus using 13C/12C analysis. Science 283: 368-370.
Roberts P., N. Perera, O. Wedage, S.Deraniyagala, J. Perera, S. Eregama, M.D. Petraglia, J.A. Lee-Thorp (2018) Fruits of the Forest: human stable isotope ecology and rainforest adaptations in Late Pleistocene and Holocene (c. 36 to 3 ka) Sri Lanka. Journal of Human Evolution.
Snoeck, CS, J Pouncett, P Claeys, S. Goderis, N Mattielli, M. Parker Pearson, C Willis, A. Zazzo, JA Lee-Thorp, RJ Schulting. 2018 Strontium isotope analysis on cremated human remains from Stonehenge support links with west Wales. Scientific Reports 8:10790. DOI:10.1038/s41598-018-28969-8
Czermak A, L. Schermellah, JA Lee-Thorp 2018 Short report: Image-assisted time-resolved dentine sampling to track weaning histories. DOI: 10.1002/oa.2697
Ecker M, JS Brink, L Rossousw, M Chazan, LK Horwitz, JA Lee-Thorp 2018 The palaeoecological context of the Oldowan–Acheulean in southern Africa, Nature Ecology and Evolution, 2: 1080-1086.
Lee-Thorp, J.A., M. Ecker. 2015. Holocene environmental change at Wonderwerk Cave, South Africa: Insights from stable light isotopes in ostrich egg shell. African Archaeological Review. DOI 10.1007/s10437-015-9202-y
Lee-Thorp J.A., A. Likius, T.S. Mackaye, P.  Vignaud, M. Sponheimer, M. Brunet 2012.  Isotopic evidence for an early shift to C4 resources by Pliocene hominids in Chad. Proc. Natl. Acad. Sci. 109 (50): 20369-20372.

References

Living people
British archaeologists
British women archaeologists
University of Cape Town alumni
Fellows of the British Academy
Fellows of the Royal Society of South Africa
People from Cape Town
Fellows of St Cross College, Oxford
South African archaeologists
Academics of the University of Bradford
Academic staff of the University of Cape Town
1951 births